Christophe Dupouey (8 August 1968 – 4 February 2009) was a French mountain biker. In 1996 he won the gold medal in the men's cross country section of the UCI Mountain Bike World Cup. In 1998 he won the gold medal in the same section of the UCI Mountain Bike & Trials World Championships. Dupouey also competed in the 1996 and 2000 Olympic Games, placing 4th in Atlanta.

In 2006 he was given a suspended three-month prison sentence for participating in a trafficking network for "pot belge", a mix of cocaine, caffeine, pain killers, sometimes amphetamines and heroin.

Dupouey committed suicide on 4 February 2009 at the age of 40.

References 

1968 births
2009 suicides
Cross-country mountain bikers
Cyclists at the 1996 Summer Olympics
Cyclists at the 2000 Summer Olympics
French male cyclists
Olympic cyclists of France
Sportspeople from Tarbes
Suicides in France
UCI Mountain Bike World Champions (men)
2009 deaths
Cyclists from Occitania (administrative region)
20th-century French people
21st-century French people